Animal Planet is a Dutch pay television channel broadcasting nature-related documentaries in the Netherlands and Flanders. The channel launched as a Pan-European feed on 1 July 1997. It is operated by Discovery Benelux.

History
The Pan-European feed of Animal Planet launched on 1 July 1997 in the Benelux. Initially Dutch subtitles would be added in late 1997. Several programs had subtitles through teletext in January 1998. A few months later on, the teletext subtitles were replaced by DVB subtitles. A localised Dutch feed launched on 16 February 2004.

For its first ten years in existence, the channel used a logo with a globe and an elephant which was also used by its sister channels. On 1 October 2008, the channel switched to a new logo, which had previously been adopted by Animal Planet in the United States.

A European high-definition version of the channel, called Animal Planet HD, launched in the Nordic countries on 3 February 2009. In the Netherlands, the high-definition version of the channel launched through Glashart Media on 19 March 2010.

On 4 July 2011, Discovery Networks Benelux launched TLC for the female audience in the Netherlands. Until 1 October 2012, TLC aired between 6:00 pm and 2:00 am on the standard-definition version of Animal Planet, making this channel a time-sharing channel. On 1 October 2012, TLC extended its broadcasting time from 3:00 pm until 2:00 am. The HD simulcast of Animal Planet remains 24 hours.

TLC wasn't available in Belgium. Belgian viewers got the pan-European Animal Planet from then on, except for the satellite viewers. The Dutch feed was used by the Belgian provider of satellite television, TV Vlaanderen Digitaal. During the broadcasting time of TLC, Animal Planet blacked out due to television rights issues.

As of 8 January 2013, Animal Planet SD became 24 hours again.

Programming 
Animal Airport
Animal Battlegrounds
America's Cutest...
Animal Cops: Houston
Animal Cops: Miami
Animal Cops: Philadelphia
Animal Cops: Phoenix
Animal Cops: South Africa
Animal Crackers
Animal Precinct
Austin Stevens Adventures
Austin Stevens: Snakemaster
Baboons with Bill Bailey
Baby Planet
Bad Dog!
Big Cat Diary
Bondi Vet
Cats 101
Cheetah Kingdom
Chris Humfrey's Wildlife
Corwin's Quest
Dark Days in Monkey City
Deadly Waters
Dick 'N' Dom Go Wild!
Dogs 101
Echo and the Elephants of Amboseli
Earthquake: Panda Rescue
Escape to Chimp Eden
Galapagos
Gorilla School
Great Savannah Race
Great White Appetite
Great White Invasion
Great White Shark: Uncaged
Growing Up...
How Sharks Hunt
I'm Alive
Into the Pride
Karina: Wild on Safari
Killer Crocs
Lions and Giants
Meerkat Manor
Monkey Life
Monster Bug Wars
Must Love Cats
Mutant Planet
My Cat from Hell
National Parks Australia: Kakadu
National Parks New Zealand: Fiordland
Natural World
Orangutan Island
Pets 101
Plants vs. Zombies: The Series (Plak vrs. Zombeck: Shpill Seriesa)
The Planet's Funniest Animals
Safari Vet School
Search for the Knysna elephants
Shamwari: A Wild Life
Shark After Dark
Shark Attack File 3
Shark Attack Survival Guide
Shark City
Shark Family
Shark Feeding Frenzy
Shark Tribe
Sharks of Palau
Sharks Under Glass
Speed of Life
Swarm Chasers
Talk to the Animals
Trophy Cats
Untamed & Uncut
Venom Hunter with Donald Schultz
Weird Creatures with Nick Baker
Whale Wars
Wild Africa Rescue
Wild Animal Orphans
Wildest India
Wildest Latin America
Wildlife SOS
Wild Europe
World Wild Vet
Your Very First Puppy
Your Worst Animal Nightmares
Up Close and Dangerous

References 

Dutch
Television channels in the Netherlands
Television channels in Flanders
Television channels in Belgium
Television channels and stations established in 1997